KCAM-FM is a radio station licensed to Glennallen, Alaska, broadcasting on 88.7 MHz FM. The station airs a contemporary Christian music format, and is owned by Joy Media Ministries.

References

External links
 
 

2011 establishments in Alaska
CAM-FM
Copper River Census Area, Alaska
Radio stations established in 2011
Contemporary Christian radio stations in the United States